This is a list of defunct airlines of Mexico.

See also
List of airlines of Mexico
List of airports in Mexico

References

Mexico
Airlines, defunct
Airlines, Defunct